Ixodes texanus is a species of ticks in the genus Ixodes. It mainly infects raccoons (Procyon lotor), but has also been recorded on the marsh rice rat (Oryzomys palustris) in Georgia.

See also
List of parasites of the marsh rice rat

References

Literature cited
Wilson, N. and Durden, L.A. 2003. Ectoparasites of terrestrial vertebrates inhabiting the Georgia Barrier Islands, USA: an inventory and preliminary biogeographical analysis (subscription required). Journal of Biogeography 30(8):1207–1220.

texanus
Arachnids of North America
Parasitic arthropods of mammals